Kaze may refer to:

 KAZE, an American radio station located in Texas
 KAZe, a Japanese video game developer
 Kazé, a French publishing company
 Kaze-Forces for the Defense of Democracy, a political party in Burundi

Fiction
 Kaze (television show), a 1967 jidaigeki (Japanese period drama)
 Kaze Hikaru, a Japanese manga series by Taeko Watanabe
 Kaze no Stigma, a Japanese light novel series by Takahiro Yamato
 Kaze to Ki no Uta, a Japanese manga series by Keiko Takemiya
 Kaze to Kumo to Niji to, a 1976 Japanese historical television series

Music
 Kaze (band), Japanese pop music duo composed of Shōzō Ise and Kazuhisa Ōkubo
 Kaze (rapper), American hip hop artist from North Carolina
"Kaze" (song), a Japanese nursery rhyme
 "Kaze", a 2004 song by Japanese pop singer Aya Ueto
 "Kaze ga Soyogu Basho", a 1999 song by Japanese pop singer Miho Komatsu
 "Kaze ni Kienaide", a 1996 song by Japanese rock band L'Arc-en-Ciel